The 2002 Brent London Borough Council  election took place on 2 May 2002 to elect members of Brent London Borough Council in London, England. The whole council was up for election with boundary changes since the last election in 1998 reducing the number of seats by 3. The Labour party stayed in overall control of the council.

Election result
Labour lost 8 seats, but remained in control of the council.

|}

The above totals include the delayed election in Northwick Park on 13 June 2002.

Ward results

Northwick Park delayed election
The election in Northwick Park was delayed until 13 June 2002 after the death of one of the Liberal Democrat candidates. All 3 seats were won by the Conservative party.

References

2002
2002 London Borough council elections